The Hayward Japanese Gardens  are the oldest traditional-style Japanese gardens in California. The gardens  are maintained by the recreation and park district  of Hayward.

History
The site formerly housed the Hayward High School agricultural studies program, from 1913 to 1962. The land was designated as a future park site in 1962, with HARD beginning the acquisition process in 1972. The park's current area was fully acquired by 1976, and the park was dedicated in 1980.

Design
The garden was designed by Kimio Kimura.  It follows Japanese garden design principles, using California native stone and plants.
 
The garden contains over 70 plant species including mondo grasses, Japanese black pine,  cedar, juniper, and rhododendron.  No stains were used on the wood constructions.  Nails and fasteners are recessed, and all wood was notched, and aged, to simulate the appearance of a traditional Japanese garden.

Activities
The Japanese Gardens are open to the public daily  except Christmas.
The site hosts weddings.

References

Parks in Hayward, California
Japanese gardens in California
Tourist attractions in Alameda County, California
Culture of Hayward, California